Zarzir, also known as Beit Zarzir, is an Arab local council located  west of the city of Nazareth in the Northern District of Israel.

See also
Arab localities in Israel

References

Dr. Tomer Mazarib, The Integration Process of the Bedouin population into Arab Villages and Towns in the Galilee: Historical, Social and Cultural Aspects from the beginning of the 18th Century to the end of the 20th Century (Haifa: University of Haifa Press, 2016).

External links
Welcome To Zarazir.

Arab localities in Israel
Local councils in Northern District (Israel)